Yuri Vasilievich Gorobets (15 March 1932 – 27 June 2022) was a Soviet and Russian theater and cinema actor. People's Artist of the Russian Federation (1993). Laureate of the State Prize of the USSR (1984).

He was awarded Order of Friendship (2003) and Order of Honour (2007).

Selected filmography 
 Striped Trip (1961) as militiaman
 Come Tomorrow, Please... (1963) as Kostya
 Day by Day (1971–72) as Konstantin Yakushev
 Investigation Held by ZnaToKi (1975) as Medvedev
 Air Crew (1980) as Misha, dispatcher 
 Do Not Marry, Girls (1985) as minister
 Water Thieves (1993) as Sarafanych

References

External links
 
 Профиль на сайте МХАТ имени Горького
 Интервью с Юрием Горобцом

1932 births
2022 deaths
People from Vladikavkaz
Honored Artists of the RSFSR
People's Artists of Russia
Recipients of the Order of Honour (Russia)
Recipients of the USSR State Prize
Russian Academy of Theatre Arts alumni
Soviet male film actors
Soviet male stage actors
Russian male film actors
Russian male stage actors
Russian male television actors
Soviet male television actors